Garmen Point (‘Nos Garmen’ \'nos 'g&r-men\) is a point on the northwest coast of Smith Island, South Shetland Islands situated 13.65 km north-northeast of Cape James, 6.12 km south-southwest of Markeli Point and 19.65 km southwest of Cape Smith.  Formed by an offshoot of Mount Foster.  Bulgarian early mapping in 2008.  Named after the settlement of Garmen in southwestern Bulgaria.

Maps
Chart of South Shetland including Coronation Island, &c. from the exploration of the sloop Dove in the years 1821 and 1822 by George Powell Commander of the same. Scale ca. 1:200000. London: Laurie, 1822.
  L.L. Ivanov. Antarctica: Livingston Island and Greenwich, Robert, Snow and Smith Islands. Scale 1:120000 topographic map. Troyan: Manfred Wörner Foundation, 2010.  (First edition 2009. )
 South Shetland Islands: Smith and Low Islands. Scale 1:150000 topographic map No. 13677. British Antarctic Survey, 2009.
 Antarctic Digital Database (ADD). Scale 1:250000 topographic map of Antarctica. Scientific Committee on Antarctic Research (SCAR). Since 1993, regularly upgraded and updated.
 L.L. Ivanov. Antarctica: Livingston Island and Smith Island. Scale 1:100000 topographic map. Manfred Wörner Foundation, 2017.

References
 Garmen Point. SCAR Composite Antarctic Gazetteer
 Bulgarian Antarctic Gazetteer. Antarctic Place-names Commission. (details in Bulgarian, basic data in English)

External links
 Garmen Point. Copernix satellite image

Headlands of Smith Island (South Shetland Islands)
Bulgaria and the Antarctic